Ouarkoye is a department or commune of Mouhoun Province in western Burkina Faso. Its capital lies at the town of Ouarkoye. According to the 1996 census the department has a total population of 37,178.

Towns and villages
 Ouarkoye	(3 916 inhabitants) (capital)
 Bekuy	(687 inhabitants)
 Dankuy	(1 731 inhabitants)
 Darou	(492 inhabitants)
 Doudou	(3 241 inhabitants)
 Dakena	(4 426 inhabitants)
 Fouankuy	(878 inhabitants)
 Kamako	(138 inhabitants)
 Kekaba	(1 712 inhabitants)
 Koena	(1 844 inhabitants)
 Kosso	(4 348 inhabitants)
 Kouankuy	(1 507 inhabitants)
 Lokinde	(360 inhabitants)
 Miana	(471 inhabitants)
 Monkuy	(2 982 inhabitants)
 Ouanabekuy	(620 inhabitants)
 Oue	(219 inhabitants)
 Perakuy	(313 inhabitants)
 Poundou	(3 499 inhabitants)
 Samakuy	(361 inhabitants)
 Soana	(330 inhabitants)
 Sokongo	(1 280 inhabitants)
 Syn n°1	(253 inhabitants)
 Tiokuy	(1 570 inhabitants)

References

Departments of Burkina Faso
Mouhoun Province